Ray is a rural locality (a settlement) in Volokonovsky District, Belgorod Oblast, Russia. The population was 8 as of 2010. There is 1 street.

Geography 
Ray is located 17 km south of Volokonovka (the district's administrative centre) by road. Ulyanovka is the nearest rural locality.

References 

Rural localities in Volokonovsky District